Alexander or Alex Goldfarb may refer to:

 Alexander Goldfarb (biologist), microbiologist, activist, and author
 Alex Goldfarb (politician), Israeli politician and electrician